Serbia competed at the 2022 Mediterranean Games in Oran, Algeria over 11 days from 25 June to 6 July 2022.

Medalists

| width="78%" align="left" valign="top" |

| width="22%" align="left" valign="top" |

Archery 

Men

Women

Team

Artistic gymnastics

Men

Athletics 

Serbia competed in athletics.

Men
Track & road events

Field events

Women
Track & road events

Field events

Badminton 

Serbia competed in badminton.

Women

Basketball 3x3

Boules 

Lyonnaise

Boxing 

Men

Women

Cycling 

Serbia competed in cycling.

Men

Women

Fencing 

Serbia competed in fencing.

Men

Women

Handball

Summary

Men's tournament
Group play

Semifinal

Bronze medal game

Women's tournament
Group play

Semifinal

Bronze medal game

Judo 

Men

Women

Karate 

Serbia competed in karate.

Men

Women

Sailing 

Serbia competed in sailing.

Men

Women

Shooting 

Serbia competed in shooting.

Men

Women

Mixed

Swimming 

Men

Women

Table tennis 

Men

Women

Taekwondo 

Men

Women

Volleyball

Serbia competed in volleyball.

Summary

Men's tournament
Group play

|}

Women's tournament
Group play

|}

|}

Quarterfinals

|}

Semifinals

|}

Third place game

|}

Water polo

Summary

Group play

Semifinal

Final

Weightlifting 

Men

Women

Wrestling 

Men's Freestyle  wrestling

Women's Freestyle  wrestling

Greco-Roman wrestling

References

Nations at the 2022 Mediterranean Games
2022
Mediterranean Games